Abdul Manaf Metussin (born October 1966) is a Bruneian politician who currently serves as the Minister of Primary Resources and Tourism since 2022.

Education 
Abdul Manaf was born in October 1966 and holds a Bruneian nationality. He graduated from University of Leeds with honours degree in mechanical engineering and later earned his Master of Science degree in Manufacturing Systems Engineering from the University of Bradford. Moreover, he obtained a PhD in Management from Canterbury Business School.

Political career 
On May 4, 2016, Royal Brunei Airlines (RBA) appointed him as the director of the company. Abdul Manaf was appointed as the Deputy Minister of Finance and Economy on September 20, 2018, and participated in an oath-taking ceremony later that year on October 2. Later on January 4, 2021, Abdul Manaf was appointed as the Chairman of RBA after an announcement made by Sultan Hassanal Bolkiah. Due to the cabinet's reshuffling on June 7, 2022, he has been newly appointed to replace Ali Apong as the Minister of Primary Resources and Tourism.

Awards and honours

Awards 

 ASEAN Federation of Engineering Organisations (AFEO) Distinguished Honorary Patron

Honours 
 

  Order of Seri Paduka Mahkota Brunei First Class (SPMB) – Dato Seri Paduka

  Order of Setia Negara Brunei First Class (PSNB) – Dato Seri Setia

See also 

 Cabinet of Brunei

References 

Living people
1966 births
Government ministers of Brunei
Alumni of the University of Leeds
Alumni of the University of Bradford